The list of ship commissionings in 1916 includes a chronological list of all ships commissioned in 1916.


See also

References 

1916